Resmi Resmiev (19 June 1947 – November 2020) was a Bulgarian alpine skier. He competed in three events at the 1972 Winter Olympics.

References

1947 births
2020 deaths
Bulgarian male alpine skiers
Olympic alpine skiers of Bulgaria
Alpine skiers at the 1972 Winter Olympics
Sportspeople from Sofia